Skipper in Stormy Weather (Swedish: Skeppare i blåsväder) is a 1951 Swedish comedy film directed by Gunnar Olsson and starring Adolf Jahr, Elof Ahrle and Bengt Eklund. It was shot at the Råsunda Studios in Stockholm and on location around Gothenburg. The film's sets were designed by the art director Nils Svenwall.

Synopsis
An elderly fisherman refuses to recognise the need to replace his fishing vessel.

Cast
 Adolf Jahr as Alexander Alexandersson
 Elof Ahrle as 	Trekvarts-Olle
 Bengt Eklund as 	Åke Kristiansson
 Sigbrit Molin as 	Britta Alexandersson
 Gunnar Olsson as 	Birger Birgersson
 Sven-Eric Gamble as 	Verner Kristiansson
 Dagmar Olsson as 	Astrid Birgersson
 Arthur Fischer as 	Sigurd
 Magnus Kesster as 	Kristiansson Sr.
 Frithiof Bjärne as 'Tarzan'
 Mats Björne as 	Harry
 Julia Cæsar as 	Julia, customer
 Åke Grönberg as 	Singer
 Kaj Hjelm as 	Sven
 Stig Johanson as 	Gustaf
 Oscar Ljung as 	Valter
 Harry Ahlin as 	Hamnbas i Göteborg 
 Sven-Axel Carlsson as 	Bengt, skeppspojke 
 Sture Ericson as 	Varvsbokhållare 
 Siegfried Fischer as Albin, f.d. trålskeppare 
 Frithiof Hedvall as 	Restaurangvaktmästare 
 Gustaf Hiort af Ornäs as 	Båtköpare 
 Marianne Hylén as 	Greta, sjuksköterska

References

Bibliography 
 Qvist, Per Olov & von Bagh, Peter. Guide to the Cinema of Sweden and Finland. Greenwood Publishing Group, 2000.
 Wredlund, Bertil & Lindfors, Rolf. Långfilm i Sverige: 1950–1959. Proprius, 1979.

External links 
 

1951 films
Swedish comedy films
1951 comedy films
1950s Swedish-language films
Films directed by Gunnar Olsson
1950s Swedish films